The N1 is a national route that connects Brussels with Antwerp and the Dutch border near Wuustwezel.

Like all the nine major routes, the N1 conventionally begins at the Grand-Place (Grote Markt) in central Brussels and leads to the Porte d'Anvers (Antwerpsepoort), on the R20/N0 Small Ring Road. The actual trunk road starts off at Sainctelette Square. From there it follows the Avenue du Port (Havenlaan) and Chaussée de Vilvorde (Vilvoordsesteenweg) to connect with the R21 Second Ring Road at Van Praet. The road continues its way through the Port of Brussels on the Avenue de Vilvorde (Vilvoordselaan) and passes underneath the R0's tall bridge at Vilvoorde.

The N1 then proceeds through Vilvoorde and leaves the agglomeration. Between Vilvoorde and Antwerp the road is called  Brusselsesteenweg, Antwerpsesteenweg and Grote Steenweg.
It passes through Zemst, crosses the E19 motorway and connects to the R12 Mechelen ring road. From Mechelen the road passes through the municipalities of Sint-Katelijne-Waver, Rumst, Kontich, Hove, Edegem, Mortsel (R11 ring road), Wilrijk and Berchem (R1 motorway and R10 ring road).

From there the N1 enters the city of Antwerp as Mechelsesteenweg and joins the central ring road (Britselei/Frankrijklei/Italiëlei). Leaving Antwerp to the northeast on the Noorderlaan and IJzerlaan, it enters Merksem and continues to Kleine Bareel junction, where it crosses the E19 once again.
The final part of the N1 is known as Bredabaan and passes through Brasschaat and Wuustwezel, before crossing the border with the Netherlands near Zundert.

In the Netherlands it ought to continue as National Route 8, but the trunk road system has been declassified long ago, leaving the provincial road number N263.

The total length of National Route 1 is 73 km.

The N1 crosses or borders 15 municipalities. 1 in the Brussels-capital Region, 2 in Flemish Brabant and 11 in the province of Antwerp. A full list of municipalities can be found below. Major municipalities are in bold.

Junction list

See also
 Transport in Belgium

References

001
Roads in Brussels
Roads in Antwerp